Chris Haddock is a Canadian screenwriter, producer and director best known as the creator and showrunner of the CBC Television series Da Vinci's Inquest, Da Vinci's City Hall, Intelligence and The Romeo Section. He has won 14 Gemini Awards as a writer, producer and/or director and received another 15 nominations - most of them for Da Vinci's Inquest.

Career
Haddock began as a street performer, but he later focused his creative energies into screenwriting for television. One of his earliest efforts in writing was for the popular series, MacGyver, where he also served as the Story Editor and Executive Story Editor.

He founded Haddock Entertainment in 1997. Haddock is most well known for his Vancouver-based television drama creations Da Vinci's Inquest (1998-2005), Da Vinci's City Hall (2005-2006) and Intelligence (2006-2007). Most recently Chris served as writer/co-executive producer on the Martin Scorsese HBO production Boardwalk Empire, and was nominated for a Writers Guild of America award for that show. His stage play Helen Lawrence was staged internationally in 2014, including stints at the prestigious Edinburg Drama Festival, Toronto's Canadian Stage, Munich and Vancouver. His espionage drama series, The Romeo Section, debuted in 2015.

Filmography
He has been intimately involved with these shows:
 MacGyver, developed Lisa Woodman in 1989
 Da Vinci's Inquest, a CBC series - creator, writer, executive producer
 Da Vinci's City Hall, a CBC series - creator, writer, executive producer
 The Handler, a CBS series - creator, writer, executive producer
 Intelligence - creator, writer, executive producer
 The Life, a CTV television movie - co-writer, executive producer
 The Romeo Section, a CBC series - creator, writer, executive producer

References

External links
Haddock Entertainment Profile
Movietome

Canadian male screenwriters
Film producers from British Columbia
Living people
Writers from Vancouver
Year of birth missing (living people)
Canadian television producers
20th-century Canadian screenwriters
21st-century Canadian screenwriters